Black Oni is an album by progressive rock group Guapo released in 2005.

Track listing 
All music written by Guapo
I (3:33)
II (11:54)
III (10:20)
IV (5:44)
V (12:56)

Personnel 
Guapo
Daniel O'Sullivan – Fender Rhodes, Keyboards, Harmonium, Mellotron, Guitar, Electronics
Dave Smith – Drums, Percussion
Matt Thompson – Bass, Guitar, Electronics

Production
Pete Lyons – Producer, Mixing Engineer
Jaime Gomez Arellano – Mastering Engineer
Yukimaro Takematsu – Photography, Design Art Direction

External links 
[| Guapo biography and other info at allmusic.com]

2005 albums
Guapo (band) albums
Ipecac Recordings albums